Gergely Antal (born 20 March 1985) is a chess player from Hungary. He became a chess Grandmaster in 2011.

References 

1985 births
Living people
Hungarian chess players
Chess grandmasters